Columbia Union Church, originally Epping Baptist Church, is a historic church in Epping, the northeastern part of Columbia, Maine.  Built in 1829 and extensively altered in 1870, it is a fine example of a Greek Revival church with Gothic alterations.  It was listed on the National Register of Historic Places in 1997.

Description and history
The Columbia Union Church is located in northeastern Columbia, on the north side of Epping Road just east of its junction with Cemetery Road.  It is a single-story wood frame structure, with a front-facing gable roof, clapboard and shingle siding, and a granite foundation.  The front facade faces south, and has a fully pedimented gable above a pair of entrances that flank a central window.  The doors and window are topped by Gothic drip molding, which is also found on other windows.  The building's corners have pilasters, which rise to an entablature that encircles the building.  A two-stage tower rises above the front, with windows in the second stage and crenellations above.  The tower features drip molding, pilasters and friezes similar to those found on the main body.

Built in 1829 as the Epping Baptist Church, this was the first church building to be built within the municipal bounds of Columbia, which was incorporated in 1796.  The congregation had been meeting in private homes since 1788 prior to construction of this building.  It is unclear at what point the building's use changed to that of a union church (serving multiple denominations), but the Columbia Union Society was formally organized in 1866 to oversee the building's rehabilitation.  Under that organization's oversight the building was renovated, adding Gothic features such as the tower crenellations and drip molding.

See also
National Register of Historic Places listings in Washington County, Maine

References

Churches in Washington County, Maine
Churches on the National Register of Historic Places in Maine
Gothic Revival church buildings in Maine
Churches completed in 1829
19th-century Baptist churches in the United States
National Register of Historic Places in Washington County, Maine
1829 establishments in Maine